Erdenebatyn Bilegsaikhan (born 16 September 1998) is a Mongolian weightlifter. She represented Mongolia at the 2020 Summer Olympics in Tokyo, Japan.

References

External links 
 

Living people
1998 births
Mongolian female weightlifters
Weightlifters at the 2020 Summer Olympics
Olympic weightlifters of Mongolia
21st-century Mongolian women